Balwa Gujran is a village in Shamli district in the Indian state of Uttar Pradesh about 85 km from Delhi. Its nearest town is Shamli, about 3 km in distance.

Overview
Balwa Gujran is located on the Shamli–Saharanpur SH-57 highway. It is around 85 km from Delhi, 36 km from Panipat, and 65 km from both Meerut and Saharanpur. The nearest town is Shamli at a distance of 3 km. Balwa Gujran comes in Shamli Block and under Shamli Tahshil. Modern facilities for the education conscious community include a girls' junior high school and other government and private schools. Transportation is made available through RCC roads, a railway station, and bus service.

History 
Balwa Gujran was founded by the Ranas (Chauhan Gurjars) of Ranthambore and still dominated by Rana Gurjars. Balwah village of Chauhan Gurjars still exists in Ranthambore region. Balwa Gujran is a part of Kalsana Khap of Chauhan Gurjars. Khap has more than 84 villages in District Shamli.

Geography

Demographics
Provisional data from the 2011 census shows that Balwa Gujran has a population of 10,500. The sex ratio is about 850.

References

Villages in Shamli district